The Pru is a colloquial term that may refer to:

Prudential plc, a British financial services company
The Prudential Tower, a skyscraper in Boston MA